Fábio Hermínio Hempel (born October 29, 1980, in Cascavel, Paraná, Brazil) is a Brazilian football player who plays for União da Madeira. He is usually plays in the striker position.

Fábio has played for Gil Vicente and Vitória Setúbal in the Portuguese Liga. He also played for Mineros de Guayana, a Venezuelan football club, after being released by Foolad FC in Iran's Premier Football League.

External links
 

1980 births
Living people
Brazilian people of German descent
People from Cascavel
Association football forwards
Brazilian footballers
Segunda Divisão players
C.D. Feirense players
Liga Portugal 2 players
S.C. Salgueiros players
Primeira Liga players
Gil Vicente F.C. players
C.F. Estrela da Amadora players
Vitória F.C. players
Vitória S.C. players
Foolad FC players
Marília Atlético Clube players
A.C.C.D. Mineros de Guayana players
C.F. União players
Santa Cruz Futebol Clube players
Campinense Clube players
Expatriate footballers in Portugal
Expatriate footballers in Iran
Expatriate footballers in Venezuela
Brazilian expatriate footballers
Sportspeople from Paraná (state)